The 2019–20 Sri Lanka FA Cup (or Vantage FA Cup for sponsorship reasons) is the 57th season of Sri Lanka FA Cup, the top-tier knockout football tournament in Sri Lanka. A total of 827 teams will participate.

The tournament kicked off on 30 March 2019. It was put on hold following the Easter bombings, and resumed in May.

There are three stages: Preliminary Stage, District Stage, and National Stage. The Preliminary Stage was organized at league level on a knockout basis. The 64 winners from the Preliminary Stage will play in the District Stage. The 32 winners from the District Stage will join the 32 teams which play in the round of 32 last season.

Round of 64
The draw for the round of 64 was held on 1 October 2019. Matches were played in November and December 2019.

Results on 23 November 2019: 

Results on 24 November 2019:

Round of 32
The draw for the round of 32 was held on 28 November 2019. Matches were played in December 2019.

Draw and results:

Round of 16
The draw for the round of 16 was held on 17 December 2019. Matches were played in January 2020.

Results:

Quarter-finals
The draw for the quarter-finals was held on 8 January 2020.  Matches will be played on 11 and 12 January 2020.

Results:

Semi-finals
The draw for the semi-finals was held on 21 January 2020. Matches were played on 1 February 2020 at the Race Course International Stadium.

Results:

Final
Match will be played on 7 February 2020 at the Race Course International Stadium.

Result:

References

External links
Football Federation Of Sri Lanka
The Papare
RSSSF

Sri Lanka
Cup
Sri Lanka FA Cup